is a traditional school (koryū) of swordsmanship (kenjutsu) founded by Aizu Hyūga-no-Kami Iko (c. 1452–1538) in c. 1490. This school is also sometimes called Aizu Kage-ryū after the name of its founder.  The founder was also known as Aizu Ikōsai Hisatada, and his surname is sometimes written as "Aisu" instead of "Aizu".

Legacy

Modern practice

Today, the Kage-ryū of Aizu Hyūga-no-Kami Iko exists only through its influence of later schools of swordsmanship, such as Yagyū Shinkage-ryū and Kashima Shinden Jikishinkage-ryū, and the many schools that they in turn influenced.

Ko-ryū bujutsu
Japanese martial arts